Eleanor Wachtel  (born 1947 in Montreal, Quebec) is a Canadian writer and broadcaster. She is the host of the flagship literary show Writers & Company on CBC Radio One, which celebrated its 25th anniversary in October 2015. Her interviews for Writers & Company are in-depth portraits of literary figures which over the years have included Saul Bellow, Alice Munro, Michael Ondaatje and Mordecai Richler. Kazuo Ishiguro, author of Remains of the Day, has called Wachtel "one of the very finest interviewers of authors I've come across anywhere in the world." At the end of their conversation in 2013, John le Carré told her, "You do it better than anyone I know."

Early life
Wachtel was born in Montreal in 1947. Interested in books and reading from an early age, her Grade 8 teacher introduced her to the works of Shakespeare and Emily Brontë. She found high school intellectually stimulating, "surrounded by gifted classmates with diverse backgrounds." She studied English literature at McGill University, where she worked for the student newspaper and was on the executive of the Undergraduate Literary Society.

Following McGill, Wachtel enrolled ("partly by default", she says) in a master’s in journalism at Syracuse University. On graduation from the journalism program she accompanied her anthropologist husband to Kenya.

Career
After living in Kenya, and the United States, she moved to Vancouver in the mid-'70s where she worked as a freelance writer and broadcaster. During this time she was adjunct professor of women's studies at Simon Fraser University. In the fall of 1987, Wachtel became literary commentator on CBC Stereo's State of the Arts in Toronto. Her next assignment was as writer-broadcaster for The Arts Tonight, reporter for The Arts Report. She hosted The Arts Today from 1996 to 2007. Wachtel has been host of CBC Radio's Writers & Company since its inception in 1990.

A selection of Wachtel's interviews called Writers & Company was published in 1993; More Writers & Company was published by Knopf Canada in the fall of 1996. In 2003, another selection of her interviews, titled Original Minds, was brought out by HarperCollins. In 2016, Biblioasis published The Best of Writers & Company.

Wachtel is a contributor to the best-selling, Dropped Threads (2001), edited by Carol Shields and Marjorie Anderson, and Lost Classics (2000), edited by Michael Ondaatje and others. In 2007, she published Random Illuminations: Conversations With Carol Shields. Wachtel has co-edited two books: The Expo Story (1986), and Language in Her Eye (1990), and is the co-author of A Feminist Guide to the Canadian Constitution (1992).

Since 2007, Wachtel has also hosted Wachtel on the Arts on Ideas.

Awards and honours
In 2002, Wachtel won the Jack Award for the promotion of Canadian books and authors.

In 2011, Writers & Company won a Silver Prize at the New York Festivals for World's Best Radio Programs.

Wachtel has been awarded nine honorary degrees, including a Doctor of Literature from Carleton University in Ottawa (2017), a Doctor of Laws from Concordia University in Montreal (2010), a Doctor of Letters from McGill University in Montreal (2009), a Doctor of Laws, from Dalhousie University in Halifax (2007), and the Doctor of Letters (D. Litt.) from Simon Fraser University, Burnaby, B.C. (2007); Mount Saint Vincent University, Halifax (2002); Emily Carr University of Art and Design, Vancouver (2001); Athabasca University, Athabasca, Alberta (2000); St. Thomas University, Fredericton (1999). In 2004, Eleanor Wachtel was named to the Order of Canada, and in 2014 she was promoted from Member to Officer.

In 2015, Wachtel was named to the Women's Executive Network's 100 Most Powerful Women list in the Arts & Communication field.

References

External links
 Writers and Company site on CBC.ca
Records of Eleanor Wachtel are held by Simon Fraser University's Special Collections and Rare Books

Living people
Canadian feminists
CBC Radio hosts
Officers of the Order of Canada
People from Montreal
Anglophone Quebec people
1947 births
Canadian women radio hosts